Est 441 to 485 was a class of 45 French 0-4-2 locomotives for mixed service, built in 1885 for the Chemins de fer de l'Est.
They were the final development of the 0-4-2 locomotive in France.

Construction history

The locomotives were built by Société Alsacienne de Constructions Mécaniques (SACM) at their works in Graffenstaden and Belfort.

References

Bibliography

External links

 ETH-Bibliothek Zürich, Bildarchiv. Chemins der fer de l’Est 445, viewer
 ETH-Bibliothek Zürich, Bildarchiv. Armored locomotive Est series 441-485, viewer

441
0-4-2 locomotives
Steam locomotives of France
Railway locomotives introduced in 1885
Standard gauge locomotives of France
SACM locomotives